Ceyla Kirazlı (born c. 1986) is a Turkish beauty queen who was crowned Miss Universe Turkey 2006 and represented her country at the Miss Universe 2006 pageant in Los Angeles, California. Her interests include traditional dances, traveling, backgammon, swimming, music, and volleyball. Growing up in İzmir, she stands at 5' 10" and admires Atatürk, the founder of the modern Turkish Republic. Her ambition is to be a world-famous model.

External links
Ceyla Kirazlı at Miss Universe

Living people
Miss Universe 2006 contestants
1986 births
Miss Turkey winners